Vendée Poiré sur Vie Football is a French football club based in Le Poiré-sur-Vie (Vendée).

History
The club, founded in 1954, reached the third tier Championnat National, but suffered administrative relegation in 2015 and again from the fifth-tier Championnat National 3 in 2018 both for financial reasons. The latter relegation placed it in Régional 2 at the seventh tier. In 2020 the club returned to the Championnat National 3, having secured back-to-back promotions.

One of the club's players, Richmond Forson, was called up to represent Togo at the 2006 World Cup.

Current squad

References

 
Association football clubs established in 1954
1954 establishments in France
Football clubs in Pays de la Loire
Sport in Vendée